Robert Munro may refer to:
 Robert Munro, 6th Baron of Foulis (died 1323)
 Robert de Munro, 8th Baron of Foulis (died 1369)
 Robert Munro, 14th Baron of Foulis (died 1547), Scottish soldier and clan chief
 Robert Mor Munro, 15th Baron of Foulis (died 1588)
 Robert Munro, 18th Baron of Foulis (died 1633), Scottish soldier, 21st chief of Clan Munro
 Sir Robert Munro, 3rd Baronet (died 1668), 24th chief of Clan Munro
 Sir Robert Munro, 5th Baronet (died 1729), 26th chief of Clan Munro
 Sir Robert Munro, 6th Baronet (1684–1746), Scottish soldier and politician, 27th chief of Clan Munro, son of the above
 Robert Munro (archaeologist) (1835–1920), Scottish archaeologist
 Robert Munro (folklorist) (1853–?), Scottish minister and author
 Robert Munro, 1st Baron Alness (1868–1955), Scottish Liberal politician and judge
 Robert Munro (rugby union) (1839–1913), Scottish rugby union international and Church of Scotland minister
 Sir Robert Munro (lawyer) (1907–1995), New Zealand-born lawyer in Fiji
 Rob Munro (born 1946), New Zealand politician
 Rob Munro (bishop) (born 1963), English bishop

See also
 Robert Monro (1601–1680), Scottish general, also spelt Munro
 Robert Monroe (1915–1995), researcher into out-of-body experiences